The men's 10,000 metres at the 2018 Commonwealth Games, as part of the athletics programme, took place in the Carrara Stadium on 13 April 2018.

Records
Prior to this competition, the existing world and Games records were as follows:

Schedule
The schedule was as follows:

All times are Australian Eastern Standard Time (UTC+10)

Results
With fifteen entrants, the event was held as a straight final.

Final

References

Men's 10,000 metres
2018